Rumillajta (Quechua: rumi stone, llaqta place (village, town, city, country, nation), pronounced ) is a Bolivian musical quintet that formed in 1980 and became one of the most important progenitors of Andean music. They were the subjects of a short documentary from the BBC and played at festivals on three continents. Their music concerns folk themes and nature as well as more political themes like coca, foreign exploitation and indigenous rights. Rumillajta apparently ceased to exist in 2001 after the release of their last CD, Pachakuti.

Discography
Albums
City of Stone (1984)
Hoja De Coca (1984)
Pachamama (1986)
Wiracocha (1987)
Tierra Mestiza (1989)
Urupampa (1991)
Atahuallpa (1994)
Takiririllasu (1995)
Pachakuti (2001)

Contributing artist
The Rough Guide to the Music of the Andes (1996, World Music Network)
Unwired: Latin America (2001, World Music Network)

References

External links
[ All Music]

American Public Media article

Bolivian musical groups
Andean music